State Street in Boston, Massachusetts, is one of the oldest streets in the city. Located in the financial district, it is the site of some historic landmarks, such as Long Wharf, the Old State House and the Boston Custom House.

History

In 1630 the first Puritan settlers, led by John Winthrop, built their earliest houses along what is today "State Street." The Puritans also originally built the meeting house for the First Church in Boston on the street across from the marketplace, which was located where the Old State House stands today. By 1636 the thoroughfare was known as Market Street. From 1708 to 1784 it was renamed King Street.  In 1770 the Boston Massacre took place in front of the Customs House.

During the Revolutionary War, it assumed its current, non-royalist name. In the 19th century State Street became known as Boston's primary location for banks and other financial institutions.

Transportation
The Blue Line of the MBTA subway runs below State Street. Two stations have entrances on State Street:  Aquarium, and State. The Faneuil Hall Marketplace can also be found nearby.  The east end of State Street is at Long Wharf, where ferries are available to several places, including the airport.

See also

 American Apollo, 18th-century newspaper
 Boston Custom House
 Boston Evening Traveller
 Boston Massacre
 Bunch-of-Grapes, tavern
 First Town-House, Boston
 Gilbert & Dean, publishers
 Long Wharf (Boston)
 John Mein (publisher)
 Merchants Exchange (Boston)
 Old State House (Boston)
 State Street Block (Boston)

Images

References

Further reading

 
 State Street: a brief account of a Boston way. Boston:  State Street Trust Company, 1906

Streets in Boston
Financial District, Boston